This is a list of public art in Leeds, including statues and other memorials. This list applies only to works of public art on permanent display in an outdoor public space and as such does not include, for example, works in museums.

Armley

City centre

City Square

Elland Road

Headingley

Otley

Woodhouse

References

Leeds
Public art